Tavonga Kuleya (born 15 June 2004) is an English professional footballer who plays as a winger for Worksop Town F.C. on loan from EFL League One club Doncaster Rovers.

Career
He made his professional debut with Doncaster Rovers in a 3–2 EFL Trophy win over Scunthorpe United on 11 November 2021, assisting his side's first goal in the win.

In September 2022, Kuleya joined Northern Premier League Premier Division club FC United of Manchester on a one-month loan deal.

Personal life
Born in England, Kuleya is of Zimbabwean descent.

References

External links
 

2004 births
Living people
English people of Zimbabwean descent
English footballers
Association football wingers
Doncaster Rovers F.C. players
F.C. United of Manchester players
Black British sportspeople